The Books of the Kingdoms, Books of Kingdoms, or Books of Reigns are the names that four books of the Hebrew Bible are given in the Septuagint. 1 and 2 Kingdoms are equivalent to 1 and 2 Samuel, and 3 and 4 Kingdoms are equivalent to 1 and 2 Kings in most modern English versions.

These books are known in the Vulgate version as the four Books of the Kingdoms ( or ), or the Book of Kings as Jerome disagreed with the expression Books of the Kingdoms of the LXX. Jerome says:

Those books are known as the Books of Reigns in the New English Translation of the Septuagint.

References

External links 
 Full text of the Books of the Kingdoms in modern Greek

Books of Kings
Books of Samuel